Interbeat interval (IBI) is a scientific term used in the study of the mammalian heart.

Definition 
Interbeat interval is a scientific term used in reference to the time interval between individual beats of the mammalian heart. Interbeat interval is abbreviated "IBI" and is sometimes written with a hyphen, "inter-beat interval". It is also sometimes referred to as "beat-to-beat" interval.

IBI is generally measured in units of milliseconds. In normal heart function, each IBI value varies from beat to beat. This natural variation is known as heart rate variability (HRV). However, certain cardiac conditions may cause the individual IBI values to become nearly constant, resulting in the HRV being nearly zero. This can happen, for example, during periods of exercise as the heart rate increases and the beats become regular. Certain illnesses can cause the heart rate to increase and become uniform as well, such as when a subject is afflicted by an infection.

Recording 
A number of instruments have been developed for specifically recording individual IBI values. Generally, the instruments are used in basic cardiology research, as there is yet no specific condition whose IBI statistics can be used to diagnose the condition or guide treatment for the condition. However, HRV is an active field of research and IBI analysis can yield a rich amount of data that hold promise for future medical applications.

See also 
 Circulatory system
 Heart rate variability (HRV)

References 
 Malik M. and Camm, A.; Heart Rate Variability, Futura Publishing Company, 1995.

External links 
 Heart Rate Variability General Reference
 CamNtech, manufacturer of IBI-recording monitors
 Distributor of IBI-recording monitors

Heart